Lisa Aukland (born September 16, 1958) is an American professional female bodybuilder and amateur powerlifter.

Early life and education

Lisa Aukland was born in 1958 in Bay Shore, New York. She has two sisters, one older and one younger. Her childhood was a typical military family and her parents were very strict. Her father was an officer in the Air Force so her family traveled around a lot and lived on military bases. Her family moved every couple of years to states such as New York, Georgia, Mississippi, Louisiana, and Virginia. Her family also lived in Germany during part of her childhood.

Aukland learned how to make friends quickly. She joined teams on the military bases like football, softball, and bowling. Her dad coached them on their teams. Her mom was a stay-at-home mom for most of her younger years. She taught them how to sew, crochet, knit, cook, clean and garden. Her dad taught us how to use power tools and fix things, such as how to work on cars. She attended Kecoughtan High School and said she wasn't athletic in high school.

Aukland attended the University of Maryland, Baltimore for a doctorate in pharmacy, which she graduated in 1999. She attained a Bachelor of Science in pharmacy, magna cum laude at the Virginia Commonwealth University School of Medicine and an associate in science summa cum Laude at Thomas Nelson Community College.

Powerlifting career

Amateur

Aukland has won every regional and state competition she has entered and set eight world records.

Retirement

Aukland decided to officially retire from powerlifting competitions in order to concentrate on competing as a professional bodybuilder.

Legacy

She competed only in the drug-tested division, and some of those records still hold in Maryland. She was ranked 5th in the  weight class on "Powerlifting USA" magazine's list of "Top 20 Women Powerlifters in the United States for the year 2000."

Contest history

  New record in that organization

Bodybuilding career

Amateur

Aukland's first bodybuilding show was the Levrone Classic in Glen Burnie, Maryland, in 1995, which she won middleweight class and the overall title. Afterwards, she jumped right up to the national level competing in the NPC Jr. Nationals in 1996 and took fourth place. She began a successful run at the largest national level drug tested bodybuilding show, the NPC Team Universe Championships. She took fourth in 1998 only to come back and win first place and overall winner for the next three years in 1999, 2000, and 2001. After competing in Team Universe and realizing that she was close to looking like some of the women that were winning. When she won that show then went to the IFBB World Amateur Championship and took a silver medal, she figured she should get serious in bodybuilding.

These wins sent Aukland to compete in the IFBB World Amateur Championships representing the United States women's heavyweight division. She brought home a silver medal from Australia in 1999. At the 2000 World Amateur Championships, she takes 6th place in Warsaw, Poland. During this time she was working full-time and decided to take on a part-time job teaching college level paramedic pharmacology. The 2001 IFBB World Amateur Championships was called off for the Americans contestants due to an international travel advisory in response to the events of 9/11. In September 2001, she won the heavyweight and overall titles at the IFBB North American Championships in Canada. and obtained her pro card.

Professional

In February 2002, Aukland attended her first IFBB pro competition, the Ms. International. In 2004, she attended her first Ms. Olympia competition. From 2006 to 2009, she would go on to win every overall title at the Atlantic City Pro. With the exception of the 2003 and 2006 Ms. International, she would rank in the top sixth in every professional competition she attended.

Retirement
In 2010, Aukland officially retired from the sport of bodybuilding.

Legacy

During Aukland's amateur and some of her professional bodybuilding career, she described herself as a "life-time drug-free athlete," and only competed in drug tested competitions during her amateur career. However, in a later interview in her professional career, when asked about whether she had used performance-enhancing drugs, she declined to answer the question. In 2006, she revived the Most Improved Female Athlete of the Year award at the 2006 Olympia Gala.

Contest history

 1995 Levrone Classic - 1st (MW and overall)
 1996 NPC Jr Nationals - 4th (MW)
 1998 NPC Team Universe - 4th (HW)
 1999 IFBB World Amateur Championship - 2nd (HW)
 1999 NPC Team Universe - 1st (HW and overall)
 2000 NPC Team Universe - 1st (HW and overall)
 2000 IFBB World Amateur Championship - 6th (HW)
 2000 NPC National Championship - 5th (MW)
 2001 NPC Team Universe - 1st (HW and overall)
 2001 IFBB North American Bodybuilding Championships - 1st (HW and overall)
 2002 IFBB Ms. International - 6th (HW)
 2003 IFBB Ms. International - 8th (HW)
 2003 IFBB Night of Champions - 5th (HW)
 2004 IFBB Night of Champions - 4th (HW)
 2004 IFBB GNC Show of Strength - 3rd (HW)
 2004 IFBB Ms. Olympia - 6th (HW)
 2005 IFBB Ms. International - 4th (HW)
 2006 IFBB Ms. International - 8th
 2006 IFBB Atlantic City Pro - 1st
 2006 IFBB Ms. Olympia - 5th
 2007 IFBB Ms. International - 4th
 2007 IFBB Atlantic City Pro - 1st (HW and overall)
 2007 IFBB Ms. Olympia - 4th
 2008 IFBB Ms. International - 3rd
 2008 IFBB Atlantic City Pro - 1st
 2008 IFBB Ms. Olympia - 4th
 2009 IFBB Atlantic City Pro - 1st
 2009 IFBB Ms. Olympia - 4th
 2010 IFBB Ms. International - 4th

Personal life

Aukland currently lives in Baltimore, Maryland. She is of Norwegian-German heritage. In 1992, she joined the Maryland Poison Center and sat for the CSPI examine in 1993. Since 1995, she is certified in Specialist in Poison Information (CSPI) and is a pharmacist.

Television appearance
Aukland, along with four other fellow female bodybuilders, starred in a MTV Virgin Mobile ringtone commercial shot in New York City on August 8, 2006. In 2011, she starred in a Constellation Energy commercial.

References

External links

1957 births
American expatriate sportspeople in Germany
American female bodybuilders
American pharmacists
American women physicians
Female powerlifters
Living people
People from Bay Shore, New York
People from Bel Air, Maryland
Sportspeople from Baltimore
Sportspeople from Georgia (U.S. state)
Sportspeople from Louisiana
Sportspeople from Mississippi
Sportspeople from Suffolk County, New York
Sportspeople from Virginia
Thomas Nelson Community College alumni
Women pharmacists
21st-century American women